Along with the annual Empire Awards that were presented by Empire magazine for best in acting, directing and film there have been honorary awards which weren't always presented on a consistent annual basis. As of the 19th Empire Awards three honorary awards are currently handed out: Empire Hero Award, Empire Inspiration Award and Icon Award.

Award history

Current honorary awards

 Empire Hero Award: 2010 to 2018
 Empire Inspiration Award: 1997; 1999 to 2002; 2004 to 2006; 2008; 2010 to 2018
 Empire Legend Award: 2012 to 2018

Retired honorary awards
 Contribution to Cinema Award: 2000 only
 Outstanding Contribution to British Cinema Award: 2005 to 2006; Outstanding Contribution To British Film: 2008 to 2010; Outstanding Contribution: 2013 only
 Independent Spirit Award: 2002 to 2005
 Lifetime Achievement Award: 1996 to 2003; 2006; Career Achievement Award: 2004 only
 Movie Masterpiece Award: 1999 to 2000
 Empire Icon Award: 2006; 2008 to 2011; 2014

Empire Special Honorary Awards
 Actor Of Our Lifetime: 2009 only
 Action Hero of Our Lifetime: 2014 only
 Legend of Our Lifetime: 2014 only
 Icon of the Decade: 2005 only
 Heath Ledger Tribute: 2009 only

Retired honorary awards

Contribution to Cinema Award
The Contribution to Cinema Award was an honorary Empire Award that was presented by Empire magazine only once at the 5th Empire Awards in 2000, to Industrial Light & Magic, in honour of significant contributions to cinema.

Winner

Outstanding Contribution To British Cinema Award
The Outstanding Contribution To British Cinema Award also known as the Best Brit Award was an honorary Empire Award that was presented by Empire magazine to honour a British star company or franchise with significant contributions to British cinema. The award was presented at the 10th and 11th Empire Awards in 2005-2006 and was handed out to Working Title Films with Eric Fellner and Tim Bevan accepting the reward and to The Harry Potter films respectively. The award was rewarded again at the 13th, 14th and 15th Empire Awards in 2008-2010 with its name changed to Outstanding Contribution To British Film and was handed out to Shane Meadows, Danny Boyle and Ray Winstone respectively and again during the 18th Empire Awards in 2013 with its name changed that year to Outstanding Contribution and handed out again to Danny Boyle.

Winners

Independent Spirit Award
The Independent Spirit Award was an honorary Empire Award that was presented by Empire magazine starting with the 7th Empire Awards in 2002 and ending with the 10th Empire Awards in 2005, with awards handed out to Alejandro Amenábar, Michael Winterbottom and Andrew Eaton, Roger Corman and Kevin Smith

Winner

Lifetime Achievement Award
The Lifetime Achievement Award was an honorary Empire Award that was presented by Empire magazine from the establishment of the Empire Awards in 1996 until the 11th Empire Awards in 2006, with no award handed out during the 10th Empire Awards. At the 9th Empire Awards in 2004 the award was called Career Achievement Award . The award was handed to honour an individual with a long and distinguished career

Winner

Movie Masterpiece Award
The Movie Masterpiece Award was an honorary Empire Award that was presented by Empire magazine at the 4th Empire Awards in 1999 and at the 5th Empire Awards in 2000 to films which were considered a masterpiece achievement.

Winners

Legend Award
The Legend Award was an honorary Empire Award that was presented by Empire magazine at the 17th Empire Awards in 2012 and 18th Empire Awards in 2013, with awards handed out to Tim Burton and Helen Mirren respectively.

Winner

References

External links

Empire Awards